Suda is a Japanese habitational name  from a village in Shinano. This surname is commonly found in northeastern and west-central Japan and on Okinawa Island. The majority of bearers descend from the Minamoto clan through the Inuoe family.  

Akari Suda (born 1991), Japanese pop singer
Anna Suda (born 1997), Japanese performer and actress 
Brian Suda (born 1979), American informatician 
Friedrich Suda (born 1939), Austrian swimmer 
Goichi Suda (born 1968), Japanese video game designer
Hubert Suda (born 1969), Maltese football player
Issei Suda (born 1940), Japanese photographer
Izumi Suda (born 1943, Newell, CA USA IT Manager
Kenji Suda (born 1966), Japanese ski jumper 
Kosuke Suda (born 1980), Japanese football player 
Kota Suda (born 1986), Japanese baseball player 
Masaki Suda (born 1993), Japanese actor and singer
Masanori Suda (born 1973), Japanese mixed martial artist 
Mohammed al-Tawudi ibn Suda (1700–1795), Arabic scholar 
Orhan Suda (1916–?), Turkish cyclist 
Peeter Süda (1883–1920), Estonian organist and composer 
Sucharit Suda (1895–1982), Thai royalty 
Tetsuo Suda (born 1948), Japanese TV presenter 
Yoshimasa Suda (born 1967), Japanese football player

See also
 Suda Chaleephay (born 1987), Thai weightlifter
 Suda (disambiguation)
 Sudha, given name